Bihartorda is a village in Hajdú-Bihar county, in the Northern Great Plain region of eastern Hungary.

Geography
It has a population of 941 people (2015).

References

Bihartorda